Ian Campbell Young (5 April 1911 – 2003) is a Scottish athlete who competed in the 1934 British Empire Games.

At the 1934 Empire Games he won the bronze medal in the 100 yards event. He was also a member of the Scottish relay team which won the bronze medal in the 4X110 yards competition. In the 220 yards contest he finished fifth.

External links
commonwealthgames.com results
Rootsweb

1911 births
2003 deaths
Scottish male sprinters
Athletes (track and field) at the 1934 British Empire Games
Commonwealth Games bronze medallists for Scotland
Commonwealth Games medallists in athletics
Medallists at the 1934 British Empire Games